Hribarjevo is a small settlement north of Velike Bloke in the Municipality of Bloke in the Inner Carniola region of Slovenia.

References

External links 

Hribarjevo on Geopedia

Populated places in the Municipality of Bloke